Francis Lockier, D.D. (b Norwich 9 May 1668 – d Peterborough 17 July 1740) was the Dean of Peterborough from 1725 until his death.

He was educated at Norwich School and Trinity College, Cambridge. He held the Yorkshire livings of Handsworth and Aston. He was also Chaplain to the King from 1717 until 17127.

References

1668 births
1740 deaths
17th-century English Anglican priests
18th-century English Anglican priests
Deans of Peterborough
Alumni of Trinity College, Cambridge
People educated at Norwich School